Otra Cosa ("Something Else") is the title of the fifth studio album by Mexican singer-songwriter Julieta Venegas, released worldwide on March 16, 2010. iTunes sold two versions of this album, the standard version and an iTunes LP, and it became the first iTunes LP released by a Latin artist. The deluxe iTunes release includes the music video for the single "Bien o Mal," as well as a remix by the Mexican Institute of Sound. The album was also released exclusively in Mexico in format of vinyl.

This album features collaborations with Alejandro Sergi (vocals from Miranda!) and Adrián Dárgelos (vocals from Babasónicos). The first single chosen to promote the album was the song "Bien o Mal," which topped the popularity in Mexican radio and in Latin America.

In Mexico, Otra Cosa sold 30,000 copies. Won the Latin Grammy Award for Best Short Form Music Video. The album received a Grammy Award nomination for Best Latin Pop Album.

Background

On this album Julieta Venegas served not only as a singer/songwriter but also as a producer. She directed each of the processes and the song selection, choice and management arrangements. For Otra Cosa, Venegas used the sounds of acoustic and electric guitars, synthesizers, many percussion instruments, cavaquinhos, woodwinds, pianos and accordions ever. As for the composition and subsequent recording of the album, it said on her official blog:
"Both the composition and the arrangements began to assemble at home, composing on the piano, and then up the music room I have, where I started recording with the idea of trying things, many of those things ended up being on disk , which I love, because it was something very homely, not thinking about the pressure of study, but in the quiet of my house. Not that I have a big studio, I have to clarify basic only pro tools, and many instruments this time came many cavaquinhos, percussion, synthesizers, accordion with many effects, drum machines, in short, the development of ideas was something I did in solitude, and sometimes forgetting that it was preparing a disc. I came to write about 40 songs, among which I did in my house, and later in Buenos Aires, where I got together to compose Ale Sergi (Miranda!), Adrian Dargelos (Babasónicos ).... I wanted to write with other people, after be at home one time, it was refreshing to see what could come to sit with friends, both Ale and Adrian are very friendly and have been wanting to do things together, and now it happened."

Promotion 

To promote the album, Julieta Venegas began her "Otra Cosa Tour" in several cities in Mexico and the United States like the presentation at the Vive Latino of México City. At the same time she traveled to several countries in Latin America and Europe for media presentations.

After her pregnancy, she began the second part of her world "Otra Cosa Tour" on November 20, 2010 in Madrid, Spain.  She went on to continue the "Otra Cosa U.S. Tour" in several U.S. cities, Latin America, Brazil and Europe before she returned to the United States and Mexico.

Singles

The first single from the album was "Bien o Mal" released on January 18, 2010 by digital download. In Mexico it reached #5 on the charts and in Spain #45.  It was #8 on the US Latin Pop Airplay, #21 on US  Hot Latin Tracks, and #40 for US Tropical Songs. "Despedida" was released on May 11, 2010 in Mexico, Latin America and Europe, and ranked No. 35 on the Billboard Latin Pop Airplay. On March 9, 2011 Venegas released the third single, "Ya Conocerán" as announced by Sony Music Chile.

Track listing 

Otra Cosa Más - EP  (Walmart Exclusive)(only US)

 "Bien o mal"
 "Despedida"
 "Debajo de Mi Lengua"
 "Me Voy"
 "Andar Conmigo"
 "Limón y Sal"

Personnel

 Julieta Venegas - Vocals, background vocals, accordion, piano, glockenspiel, keyboards, acoustic guitar, electric guitar, cavaquinho, banjo, xylophone, ukulele, Fender Rhodes, melodion, percussions, handclaps, programming, composer
 Cachorro López - bass guitar, programming, claps, composer
 Dany Avila - Drums, percussion
 Alejandro "Ale" Sergi - Vocals (background), composer
 Adrían Dargelos - Composer
 Demian Nava - Programming, percussions
 Sebastian Schon - Flute, tenor saxophone, handclaps, vocals (background),  programming
 Mono Huarto - double bass
 Santiago Castellani - Tuba
 Leo Heras - Clarinet
 Juan Carlos de Urquiza - Trumpet
 Ana Schon, Ana Piñero, Lola Piñero, Valentino Ohanian - Vocals (background)
 Daniel Melingo - Bouzuki
 Juan Blas Caballero - Programming, percussion
 Sandra Baylac - Claps, vocals (background)
 Patricio Villarejo - Cello
 Florencia Ciarlo - Vocals (background)

Production
 Producers: Julieta Venegas, Cachorro López
 Engineers: Sebastián Schon, Julieta Venegas, Demian Nava
 Mixing: Cesar Sogbe
 Mastering: José Blanco
 A&R: Charlie García, Betto Rojas
 A&R drawings: Nicolás Prior
 A&R pictogrph: Ale Paul
 A&R direction: Guillermo Gutiérrez-Leyva
 Photography: Nora Lezano
 Design assistant: Silvia Canosa
 Design: Alejandro Ros

Charts and certifications

Weekly charts

Certifications

Year-end charts

Awards 
Grammy Awards

|-
| rowspan="2" align="center"|2010
| Otra Cosa
|Best Latin Pop Album
|
|-

Latin Grammy Awards

|-
| rowspan="2" align="center"|2010
| Bien o Mal
|Best Short Form Music
|
|-

References

2009 albums
Albums produced by Cachorro López
Julieta Venegas albums
Rock en Español albums
Sony International albums